Emilio C. Macias II (October 8, 1933 – June 13, 2010) was a Filipino politician who held various positions in the Philippine Government, particularly in the Province of Negros Oriental.

Early life and education
Macias was born on October 8, 1933 to former Congressman Lamberto L. Macias and Estrella Cabrera Macias.  He started his education at the West City Elementary School in Dumaguete, and then proceeded to Silliman University for his high school and college degrees. After graduating from Silliman, he went to the University of the Philippines where he obtained his Doctor in Medicine degree. He later on married, Dr. Melba Pandy Lopez, a classmate of his, and together practiced medicine at their family-owned hospital in Dumaguete until 1984.

Private and public career

Private sector
In addition to his medical practice, Macias served as president and chairman of the Rural Bank of Siaton from 1974 to 1975 and from 1978 to 1980. He also founded the Manuel L. Teves Memorial Hospital School of Midwifery, where he sat as a director until 1996.

Entry into politics
Macias’ entry into politics started when he was elected as one of the delegates to the 1971 Constitutional Convention, the body that drafted the 1973 Constitution of the Philippines. In 1975, he acquired a post in the Provincial Council in the Province of Negros Oriental, and was subsequently elected as Vice-Governor in 1980.  From 1985 to 1986, he served as Deputy Health Minister  of what was then the Health Ministry (now the Department of Health) of the Philippine Government.

Macias was elected Governor in 1988 and continued to hold on to the post for three consecutive terms until 1998. After the expiration of his term, he ran for Congress and was elected as a Representative of the 2nd District of the Province. He served for three consecutive terms until 2007 when in the same year he was again elected as Governor of the Province. In the 2010 May elections, Macias won a second term but died of liver cancer before taking his oath of office. His body was cremated and the ashes flown to Dumaguete where a three-day wake was held in the Provincial Capitol. His ashes were subsequently brought to the Municipality of Siaton, Macias' hometown.

Macias was succeeded in office by outgoing vice governor Jose Baldado in an interim capacity for the remainder of his term until then vice governor-elect Agustin Perdices took office.

References

External links
Province of Negros Oriental. Official website
House of Representatives. Official website

1933 births
2010 deaths
Governors of Negros Oriental
Members of the House of Representatives of the Philippines from Negros Oriental
Silliman University alumni
Deaths from cancer in the Philippines
Deaths from liver cancer